Flamenco A Go-Go is the second album released by guitarist and songwriter Steve Stevens, best known for playing for Billy Idol for several years. It was recorded in his home studio, and is mostly an instrumental album with a few vocal sections.

Musical genres and influences
Despite the title, the album is not a traditional flamenco album.

Stevens reported drawing inspiration from noted flamenco player Paco de Lucía after seeing him play live. The album features acoustic Spanish guitar but also departs from the flamenco genre by including electric guitar, drum and bass loops, electronics, ambient sounds and midi gear. It has contributions from session musicians Greg Ellis (percussion) and Vinnie Colaiuta (drums).

Reviews

AllMusic was very positive, calling it a "wonderful surprise", by "one of the finest guitarists of the past 20 years" and saying it will catch listeners "off guard", with dance record overtones and rhythms that will "grab every listener".

Other reviewers were not quite as kind: "This solo debut from the Bozzio Levin Stevens guitarist is quite entertaining. As anyone who's listened to either BLS album might expect, there's a large serving of really fast Spanish guitar picking on here, and a lot of it is really melodic and quite beautiful. Also unsurprisingly, there's a fair share of wankery. With many of the songs, Stevens tries to combine his flamenco-styled picking with rock, jazz, and/or new age influences, with mixed results."

Stevens said at the time:
I kind of reached an end to playing real loud, aggressive stuff. With the shred guitar thing, it always seems like I was playing to guys who were standing there with score cards or something. We weren’t creating an emotional event - it was a gymnastic event.

Track listing
"Flamenco A Go-Go"
"Cinecitta"
"Our Man In Istanbul"
"Letter To A Memory"
"Feminova"
"Velvet Cage"
"Hanina" Featuring Faudel
"Dementia"
"Twilight In Your Hands"
"Riviera"
"Jazz...An Evil Power"  (Japanese Edition Bonus Track)

References

Steve Stevens albums
2000 albums
Blues albums by American artists
Dance music albums by American artists